In number theory, a practical number or panarithmic number is a positive integer  such that all smaller positive integers can be represented as sums of distinct divisors of . For example, 12 is a practical number because all the numbers from 1 to 11 can be expressed as sums of its divisors 1, 2, 3, 4, and 6: as well as these divisors themselves, we have 5 = 3 + 2, 7 = 6 + 1, 8 = 6 + 2, 9 = 6 + 3, 10 = 6 + 3 + 1, and 11 = 6 + 3 + 2.

The sequence of practical numbers  begins

Practical numbers were used by Fibonacci in his Liber Abaci (1202) in connection with the problem of representing rational numbers as Egyptian fractions. Fibonacci does not formally define practical numbers, but he gives a table of Egyptian fraction expansions for fractions with practical denominators.

He noted that "the subdivisions of money, weights, and measures involve numbers like 4, 12, 16, 20 and 28 which are usually supposed to be so inconvenient as to deserve replacement by powers of 10." This characterization makes it possible to determine whether a number is practical by examining its prime factorization. Every even perfect number and every power of two is also a practical number.

Practical numbers have also been shown to be analogous with prime numbers in many of their properties.

Characterization of practical numbers
The original characterisation by  stated that a practical number cannot be a deficient number, that is one of which the sum of all divisors (including 1 and itself) is less than twice the number unless the deficiency is one.
.
In other words, the ordered sequence of all divisors  of a practical number has to be a complete sub-sequence.

For this to be true, the first prime  must equal 2 and, for every  from 2 to , each successive prime  must obey the inequality

where  denotes the sum of the divisors of x. For example, 2 × 32 × 29 × 823 = 429606 is practical, because the inequality above holds for each of its prime factors: 3 ≤ σ(2) + 1 = 4, 29 ≤ σ(2 × 32) + 1 = 40, and 823 ≤ σ(2 × 32 × 29) + 1 = 1171.

The condition stated above is necessary and sufficient for a number to be practical. In the other direction, the condition is sufficient, as can be shown by induction. 
Hence .

Properties
The only odd practical number is 1, because if  is an odd number greater than 2, then 2 cannot be expressed as the sum of distinct divisors  More strongly,  observes that other than 1 and 2, every practical number is divisible by 4 or 6 (or both).
The product of two practical numbers is also a practical number. More strongly the least common multiple of any two practical numbers is also a practical number. Equivalently, the set of all practical numbers is closed under multiplication.
In the set of all practical numbers there is a primitive set of practical numbers. A primitive practical number is either practical and squarefree or practical and when divided by any of its prime factors whose factorization exponent is greater than 1 is no longer practical. The sequence of primitive practical numbers  begins

Every positive integer has a practical multiple. For instance, for every integer , its multiple  is practical.

Relation to other classes of numbers
Several other notable sets of integers consist only of practical numbers:
From the above properties with  a practical number and  one of its divisors (that is) then  must also be a practical number therefore six times every power of 3 must be a practical number as well as six times every power of 2.
Every power of two is a practical number. Powers of two trivially satisfy the characterization of practical numbers in terms of their prime factorizations: the only prime in their factorizations, p1, equals two as required. 
Every even perfect number is also a practical number. This follows from Leonhard Euler's result that an even perfect number must have the form . The odd part of this factorization equals the sum of the divisors of the even part, so every odd prime factor of such a number must be at most the sum of the divisors of the even part of the number. Therefore, this number must satisfy the characterization of practical numbers.
Every primorial (the product of the first  primes, for some ) is practical. For the first two primorials, two and six, this is clear. Each successive primorial is formed by multiplying a prime number  by a smaller primorial that is divisible by both two and the next smaller prime, . By Bertrand's postulate, so each successive prime factor in the primorial is less than one of the divisors of the previous primorial. By induction, it follows that every primorial satisfies the characterization of practical numbers. Because a primorial is, by definition, squarefree it is also a primitive practical number.
Generalizing the primorials, any number that is the product of nonzero powers of the first  primes must also be practical. This includes Ramanujan's highly composite numbers (numbers with more divisors than any smaller positive integer) as well as the factorial numbers.

Practical numbers and Egyptian fractions
For instance,

Fibonacci, in his 1202 book Liber Abaci lists several methods for finding Egyptian fraction representations of a rational number. Of these, the first is to test whether the number is itself already a unit fraction, but the second is to search for a representation of the numerator as a sum of divisors of the denominator, as described above. This method is only guaranteed to succeed for denominators that are practical. Fibonacci provides tables of these representations for fractions having as denominators the practical numbers 6, 8, 12, 20, 24, 60, and 100.

 showed that every rational number  has an Egyptian fraction representation with  terms. It follows from these choices that .

According to a September 2015 conjecture by Zhi-Wei Sun, every positive rational number has an Egyptian fraction representation in which every denominator is a practical number.

Analogies with prime numbers 

One reason for interest in practical numbers is that many of their properties are similar to properties of the prime numbers. 
Indeed, theorems analogous to Goldbach's conjecture and the twin prime conjecture are known for practical numbers: every positive even integer is the sum of two practical numbers, and there exist infinitely many triples of practical numbers . Melfi also showed that there are infinitely many practical Fibonacci numbers ; the analogous question of the existence of infinitely many Fibonacci primes is open.  showed that there always exists a practical number in the interval  for any positive real , a result analogous to Legendre's conjecture for primes. Moreover, for all sufficiently large , the interval  contains many practical numbers.

Let  count how many practical numbers are at 
 proved Margenstern's conjecture. We have

where  Thus the practical numbers are about 33.6% more numerous than the prime numbers. The exact value of the constant factor  is given by

where  is the Euler–Mascheroni constant and  runs over primes.

we have

If , then . 
For example, about 38.26% of practical numbers have a last decimal digit of 0, while the last digits of 2, 4, 6, 8 each occur with the same relative frequency of 15.43%.

Notes

References

.
.
.
.
.
.
.
.
.
.
.
.
.
.
.
.
.
.
.
.
.
.
.

External links 
Tables of practical numbers  compiled by Giuseppe Melfi.

Integer sequences
Egyptian fractions